Rani Hoff is an American mental health researcher with emphasis on veteran and veteran affairs. She earned her degrees in the epidemiology of both chronic disease and mental health service research and psychiatry. Hoff is the Director of the Northeast Program Evaluation Center (NEPEC) as well as Professor of Psychiatry, and Director, Evaluation Division, National Center for PTSD, all at Yale University; She earned a BS from Mercyhurst University in Mathematics and Biology.

Hoff is a former associate director of the Robert Wood Johnson Foundation Clinical Scholars Program. and the head of the Women and Trauma Core of Women’s Health at Yale.

Early life
Rani Hoff hails from Erie, Pennsylvania and was an early graduate of college before joining the Army, in part to take advantage of the Army's GI bill and attend medical school.

References

Yale School of Public Health alumni
Yale University faculty
Mercyhurst University alumni
American women epidemiologists
American epidemiologists
Living people
Year of birth missing (living people)
Post-traumatic stress disorder
21st-century American women